David Doherty (born 28 January 1987 in Leeds, West Yorkshire, England) is an English rugby union footballer for the Yorkshire Carnegie in the RFU Championship, as a fullback or on the wing and he can also operate in the centre's.

He joined Wasps after Leeds Tykes were relegated from the 2005-06 Guinness Premiership. He is a former rugby league junior with the Leeds Rhinos, but decided to pursue a career in the 15 a-side code.

In May 2008, it was announced that Doherty would be joining Sale Sharks on a two-year contract. His contract was not renewed by Sale and in June 2010 he was released. In October 2010, it was announced that he had signed for National League 2 South team Jersey. Doherty made the perfect start to his Jersey career, scoring a try on his debut.

On 21 April 2011, it was announced that Doherty would be joining RFU Championship side the Cornish Pirates at the end of the 2010-11 RFU Championship. He finished the season as top try scorer for the Cornish Pirates with 14 in 24 Championship appearances and in 2012–13 will play for Yorkshire Carnegie.

References

External links 
Sale profile
Wasps profile
Leeds profile
England profile

1987 births
Living people
Barbarian F.C. players
Cornish Pirates players
English rugby league players
English rugby union players
Jersey rugby union players
Leeds Rhinos players
Leeds Tykes players
People educated at Mount St Mary's Catholic High School, Leeds
Rugby league players from Leeds
Rugby union players from Leeds
Sale Sharks players
Wasps RFC players